Anita Polgáriová (born 1993) is a Slovak beauty pageant titleholder who was crowned Miss Slovak Republic 2015 first runner up on a nationwide pageant held at Slovak Republic. She represented Slovak Republic at the Miss Earth 2015 and did not place into Top 16.

Biography
Anita is a 22-year-old student of law at the University of Comenius, Batislavav.

Miss Universe Slovenskej Republiky 2015
Anita finished as first runner up on March 6, 2015 in Bratislava. The runners-up awarded as "Miss Earth Slovak Republic" and "Miss Intercontinental Slovak Republic". Thus, Anita became the 11th Slovakian woman who was crowned as Miss Earth Slovak Republic title since 2005. The main title was won by Denisa Vyšnovská and is Slovak Republic's representative at Miss Universe 2015.

Miss Earth 2015
Being the Miss Earth Slovak Republic 2015, Anita is Slovak Republic's representative to be Miss Earth 2015 and would try to succeed Jamie Herrell as the next Miss Earth.

References

External links
 Miss Earth Official Website

Miss Earth 2015 contestants
Slovak beauty pageant winners
Living people
1993 births
People from Rožňava